Echinoplectanum laeve is a species of diplectanid monogenean parasitic on the gills of the black-saddled coralgrouper, Plectropomus laevis. It has been described in 2006.

E. laeve is the type-species of the genus Echinoplectanum.

Etymology
Echinoplectanum laeve was named for the species of its type-host, Plectropomus laevis. Justine & Euzet also indicated that “the epithet laeve (Latin for smooth) was not inappropriate for a diplectanid without tegumental body scales”.

Hosts and localities

The black-saddled coral grouper Plectropomus laevis is the type-host of Echinoplectanum laeve. The type-locality is the coral reef off Nouméa, New Caledonia.

References

External links 

Diplectanidae
Animals described in 2006
Fauna of New Caledonia